Aalst may refer to:

 Aalst, Belgium, a city and municipality in Belgium
 Aalst, Buren, a village in the Netherlands, in the province of Gelderland
 Aalst, North Brabant, a village in the Netherlands, in the province of North-Brabant
 Aalst, Zaltbommel, a village in the Netherlands, in the province of Gelderland
 Aalst (play), by Pol Heyvaert

People with the name
 Everard Aalst (1602–1657), Dutch painter
 Roy van Aalst (born 1983), Dutch politician
 Wil van der Aalst (born 1966), Dutch computer scientist